The ANZAC Battle Group was an Australian-led battle group deployed to Timor Leste as part of Operation Astute. The battle group was established in September 2006 and comprised several rifle companies, including a company from the New Zealand Army, and sub-units of other Australian Army units.

Rotations
As at June 2009 there have been six rotations of the ANZAC Battle Group.

First Rotation
 Headquarters, 6th Battalion, Royal Australian Regiment
 B Company, 1st Battalion, Royal Australian Regiment 
 A Company, 6th Battalion, Royal Australian Regiment
 D Company, 2/1st Battalion, Royal New Zealand Infantry Regiment
 Battery, 16th Air Defence Regiment, Royal Australian Artillery (operating as infantry)
 17 Construction Squadron, Royal Australian Engineers
 7 Combat Service Support Battalion
 Elements, B Squadron, 3rd/4th Cavalry Regiment 
 B Squadron, 5th Aviation Regiment
 Troop, 1st Aviation Regiment
 Elements, 7 Command Support Regiment

Second Rotation
 Headquarters, 1st Battalion, Royal Australian Regiment
 B Company, 1st Battalion, Royal Australian Regiment 
 C Company, 1st Battalion, Royal Australian Regiment
 Victor Company, 1st Battalion, Royal New Zealand Infantry Regiment
 111 AD Battery, 16th Air Defence Regiment, Royal Australian Artillery
 Elements, 4th Field Regiment, Royal Australian Artillery
 Support Company, 1st Battalion, Royal Australian Regiment
 Administration Company, 1st Battalion, Royal Australian Regiment
 Elements, 1st Military Police Battalion
 Elements, 17 Construction Squadron, Royal Australian Engineers
 Elements, B Squadron, 3rd/4th Cavalry Regiment 
 Elements, B Squadron, 5th Aviation Regiment
 Troop, 1st Aviation Regiment

Third Rotation
The Battle Group was renamed Battle Group Samichon for this rotation

 Headquarters, 2nd Battalion, Royal Australian Regiment
 Three rifle companies from 2nd Battalion, Royal Australian Regiment
 Bravo Company, 2nd/1st Battalion, Royal New Zealand Infantry Regiment
 Administration Company, Royal Australian Regiment
 Mechanised Platoon, 7th Battalion, Royal Australian Regiment
 Elements, 4th Field Regiment, Royal Australian Artillery
 Elements, 1st Military Police Battalion
 Elements, 3rd Combat Engineer Regiment, Royal Australian Engineers
 Elements, 3rd Combat Service Support Battalion
 Elements, B Squadron, 5th Aviation Regiment
 Troop, 1st Aviation Regiment

Fourth Rotation

Fifth Rotation
The Battle Group was renamed Battle Group Tiger for its rotation.

Elements included, but were not limited to:
 Headquarters, 5th Battalion, Royal Australian Regiment
 A Company, 5th Battalion, Royal Australian Regiment
 C Company, 5th Battalion, Royal Australian Regiment (returned home after four months)
 D Company, 5th Battalion, Royal Australian Regiment
 A single company from the Royal New Zealand Infantry
 110 AD Battery, 16th Air Defence Regiment, Royal Australian Artillery (re-rolled as an G Infantry Company)

Sixth Rotation
The battle group was known as TLBG-VI was made up of elements from the 2 RAR, 1st Armoured Regiment, 3 CER, as well as a company of 2nd/1st Battalion, Royal New Zealand Infantry Regiment with Queen Alexandra's Mounted Rifles in support.
 Headquarters 2nd Battalion, Royal Australian Regiment 
 A Company, 2nd Battalion, Royal Australian Regiment
 C Company, 2nd Battalion, Royal Australian Regiment
 Admin Company, 2nd Battalion, Royal Australian Regiment
 A single company from the Royal New Zealand Infantry Regiment

References

 Australian Department of Defence Operation Astute
 Captain Al Green '1RAR spread far and wide' in Army News Edition 1162, 22 March 2007

Military units and formations of the Australian Army
Military units and formations of the New Zealand Army
Military history of East Timor
Military units and formations established in 2006
ANZAC units and formations
ANZAC